Windy may refer to:

Music
 Windy (album), a 1968 album by Astrud Gilberto
 Windy (EP), a 2021 extended play by Jeon So-yeon
 "Windy" (The Association song) (1967)
 "Windy" (Scarlet Pleasure song) (2014)

People and fictional characters
 Windy (comics), a Walter Lantz cartoon character
 Windy (nickname), a list of people
 Emerson Windy, 21st century American hip hopper
 Windy Weber, American musician in the duo Windy & Carl
 Windy Miller, a character in Camberwick Green, a British 1966 children's television series

Places
 Windy, West Virginia, United States, an unincorporated community
 Windy Hill (disambiguation)
 Windy Lake, a list of lakes in Ontario, Canada
 Windy Pass (disambiguation), various mountain passes in the United States and one in Canada
 Windy Peak (disambiguation), various mountain summits in the United States, and one each in Canada and Antarctica
 Windy Point (disambiguation)
 Windy Range, British Columbia, Canada, a mountain range
 Windy Run, Arlington County, Virginia, United States, a stream

Other uses
 Windy (dinghy), a class of dinghy
 Windy (weather service), an interactive weather forecasting service
 Radio Windy or Windy FM, a defunct radio station in Wellington, New Zealand
 West Indies cricket team or the Windies

See also
 Wind (disambiguation)